The 20807/20808 Hirakud SF Express is a tri-weekly express train which runs between Amritsar and Visakhapatnam. It passes through the cities of Delhi, Agra, Gwalior, Jhansi, Bilaspur, Sambalpur, Bhubaneswar and  Brahmapur. It was initially introduced between Sambalpur and Hazrat Nizamuddin railway station (Delhi) in 1992. Later in 2002 it was extended to Bhubaneswar and thereafter up to Visakhapatnam and Amritsar in the coming years.

Etymology
Hira means diamond and Kud means island in Sambalpuri language spoken in Western Odisha. Sambalpur was famous as an ancient diamond mine and reference about it can be found in the works of Claudius Ptolemy, Edward Gibbon, Jean-Baptiste Tavernier. Hirakud Express is named after the famous Hirakud Dam in Sambalpur, Odisha which is one of the longest dams of India.

Coach composition
The coach composition of the 18507/18508 train is:

 1 AC 2 Tier
 4 AC 3 Tier
 6 Sleeper Class
 4 Second Class(Unreserved)
 1 Pantry Car
 1 EOG
 1 SRL
From Visakhapatnam to Amritsar

From Amritsar to Visakhapatnam

Timetable
20807- Starts from Visakhapatnam every Saturday,Tuesday and Friday reaches Amritsar Junction  on 3rd day.
20808- Starts from Amritsar Jn every Wednesday,Saturday and Sunday and reaches Visakhapatnam on 3rd day.

Major stops

Rake sharing
This train shares its rake with Visakhapatnam–Hazur Sahib Nanded Superfast Express

See also

List of named passenger trains in India
Indian Railways coaching stock

References

External links

Named passenger trains of India
Transport in Amritsar
Transport in Visakhapatnam
Rail transport in Andhra Pradesh
Rail transport in Odisha
Rail transport in Chhattisgarh
Rail transport in Punjab, India
Rail transport in Uttar Pradesh
Rail transport in Madhya Pradesh
Rail transport in Haryana
Rail transport in Delhi
Express trains in India